The Old Effingham County Courthouse is a historic county courthouse in Springfield, the county seat of Effingham County in east central Georgia. It is located on Georgia State Route 21, at 901 North Pine Street in Springfield.

The courthouse was designed by Savannah architect Hyman C. Whitcover and was built from 1908 to 1909 at a cost of $40,000, soon after George Mills Brinson's railroad was extended to Springfield in August 1907.
 
The courthouse is in the Neoclassical style, with Palladian aspects.  The building replaced a previous county courthouse built in 1849.

The Old Effingham County Courthouse was added to the National Register of Historic Places on September 18, 1980.

Construction began on a new courthouse, officially the Effingham County Judicial Complex, in 2004, with construction complete by late 2006, occupation in January 2007, and a dedication ceremony in March 2007. The old courthouse is now used as the Effingham County district attorney's office. The offices of the county tax commissioner are also located in old courthouse. Other county administrative offices are located in separate building (formerly a church) near the new courthouse.

See also
National Register of Historic Places listings in Effingham County, Georgia

References

External links
Exterior and interior photographs of the Old Effingham County Courthouse
 

Buildings and structures in Effingham County, Georgia
Effingham County Courthouse
Courthouses on the National Register of Historic Places in Georgia (U.S. state)
Government buildings completed in 1909
Palladian architecture
Neoclassical architecture in Georgia (U.S. state)
National Register of Historic Places in Effingham County, Georgia